Kingfisher Xpress was a new Door-to-Door cargo delivery service from Kingfisher Airlines. Kingfisher Xpress Same Day service was India's first and only same day delivery by air service.

Service
Service offered a pick-up facility in the eight main metropolitan cities of India namely Mumbai, New Delhi, Bangalore, Hyderabad, Chennai, Ahmedabad, Cochin and Kolkata with guaranteed same-day delivery in up to 22 cities of India namely Ahmedabad, Bagdogra, Bangalore, Chennai, Coimbatore, Delhi, Kochi, Goa, Guwahati, Hyderabad, Indore, Jaipur, Kolkata, Mumbai, Patna, Raipur, Ranchi, Lucknow, Nagpur, Pune, Srinagar and Tiruvanathapuram.

Destinations

Andhra Pradesh
 Hyderabad - Rajiv Gandhi International Airport (pick up facility)

Assam
 Guwahati - Lokpriya Gopinath Bordoloi International Airport

Chhattisgarh
 Raipur - Raipur Airport

Delhi
 New Delhi - Indira Gandhi International Airport (pick up facility)

Goa
 Vasco da Gama - Dabolim Airport

Gujarat
 Ahmedabad - Sardar Vallabhbhai Patel International Airport (pick up facility)

Jammu and Kashmir
 Srinagar - Srinagar Airport

Jharkhand
 Ranchi - Birsa Munda Airport

Karnataka
 Bangalore - Bengaluru International Airport (pick up facility)

Kerala
 Cochin - Cochin International Airport (pick up facility)
 Tiruvanathapuram - Trivandrum International Airport

Madhya Pradesh
 Indore - Devi Ahilyabai Holkar Airport

Maharashtra
 Mumbai - Chhatrapati Shivaji International Airport (pick up facility)
 Nagpur - Dr. Babasaheb Ambedkar International Airport
 Pune - Pune International Airport

Rajasthan
 Jaipur - Jaipur International Airport

Tamil Nadu
 Chennai - Chennai International Airport (pick up facility)
 Coimbatore - Coimbatore Airport

Uttar Pradesh
 Lucknow - Amausi Airport

West Bengal
 Kolkata - Netaji Subhash Chandra Bose International Airport (pick up facility)
 Siliguri - Bagdogra Airport

References

Transport companies established in 2010
Logistics companies of India
Express mail
Companies based in Mumbai
Indian companies established in 2010
2010 establishments in Maharashtra
2013 disestablishments in India
United Breweries Group